American Standard Companies was a  manufacturer of heating, ventilation, and air conditioning (HVAC) systems, plumbing fixtures, and automotive parts. The company was formed in 1929 through the merger of the American Radiator Company and Standard Sanitary Manufacturing Company forming the American Radiator and Standard Sanitary Corporation. The name was simplified to American Standard in 1967.

The company was broken up in 2007 with the spin off of the automotive parts business as WABCO Vehicle Control Systems and sale of the plumbing fixtures business as American Standard Brands. The remaining business was renamed Trane, which continues to build HVAC systems under the American Standard name. Trane was acquired by Ingersoll Rand in 2008, and the parent company has since been renamed Trane Technologies.

History 

In 1929, the American Radiator Company (founded 1892) merged with the Standard Sanitary Manufacturing Company (founded 1875) to form the American Radiator and Standard Sanitary Corporation. The plumbing division, Standard Sanitary, would continue to sell their products under the "Standard" label until 1967, when the company changed its name to American Standard Corporation. The American Standard label was used for both divisions from that year on.

In 1929, American Standard bought the Kewanee Toilet Boiler Company, which it kept until the early 1970s. 

In 1968, the group purchased earthmoving and mining product range of the Westinghouse Air Brake Company (WABCO). It divested itself of these assets in 1984.

In 1984, the group acquired HVAC manufacturer Trane. In 1999, American Standard purchased control of the United Kingdom-based plumbing fixture companies Armitage Shanks and Ceramica Dolomite of Italy from Blue Circle Industries for $430 million.

On February 1, 2007 the company announced it would break up its three divisions:

The automotive parts business was spun off, forming WABCO Vehicle Control Systems.
The plumbing fixtures division was sold off to Bain Capital for $1.745 billion. Bain sold the North American and Asian operations to Sun Capital and Lixil Group respectively, while retaining the European and Latin American operations as Ideal Standard. The deal also included the rights to use the former company name in North America operating as American Standard Brands.
The remainder of the company took the name of its heating and air conditioning subsidiary Trane. Ingersoll Rand made an offer to acquire Trane on December 17, 2007 and the sale was completed on June 5, 2008. The parent company has since been renamed Trane Technologies.

References

Literature

External links 
 Archived website of the former American Standard Companies
 American Standard (plumbing fixtures)
 American Standard Heating & Air Conditioning

Companies based in Middlesex County, New Jersey
Manufacturing companies established in 1929
Defunct companies based in New Jersey
Bathroom fixture companies
Manufacturing companies disestablished in 2007
Heating, ventilation, and air conditioning companies
Piscataway, New Jersey